Barry Bremen (June 30, 1947 – June 30, 2011) was a West Bloomfield, Michigan, insurance and novelty goods salesman and marketing executive known in the sports world as The Great Imposter. From the period 1979 to 1986, the 6'4", "lean" Bremen posed as a Major League Baseball umpire in the World Series, a player in a Major League Baseball All-Star Game, a player in a National Basketball Association All-Star Game, a referee in the National Football League, a Dallas Cowboys cheerleader, and a professional golfer. He also posed as an Emmy Award accepter.

Bremen was a self-proclaimed jock who regularly played touch football, basketball, and softball. His wife Margo, in a 1980 People magazine profile of the imposter, said Bremen was "fulfilling a grand fantasy to be in the limelight. He feels if you have no guts you have no glory in your life." His advice to other impostors: "Don't do it. It's against the law. Stay away. This is my act."

He is known to be the biological donor father of at least 40 children.

Impersonations

Basketball 
On February 4, 1979, Bremen donned a Kansas City Kings uniform and got onto the floor during pre-game warmups for the NBA All-Star Game at the Pontiac Silverdome. (He was outed by genuine All-Star Otis Birdsong, who really did play for Kansas City: "You're on my team, and I don't even know who you is.")

Bremen repeated that act in a Houston Rockets uniform at the 1981 All-Star Game at the Richfield Coliseum. Later that season, he donned an officials' jacket and stood with the real officials, Earl Strom, Paul Mihalak and alternate Joe Gushue, during the national anthem prior to Game 5 of the  NBA Finals at the Boston Garden.

Baseball 
On July 17, 1979, with the help of telecaster Dick Schaap and Kansas City Royals third basemen George Brett, Bremen snuck onto the field dressed in a New York Yankees uniform at the Major League Baseball All-Star Game, held at the Seattle Kingdome. Bremen shagged flies in the outfield for a half-hour and attempted to pose for a group picture with future Hall of Famers Brett, Reggie Jackson, Joe Morgan, Mike Schmidt, Gaylord Perry, Dave Winfield, Steve Carlton, Nolan Ryan, Carl Yastrzemski, Lou Brock, and Tommy Lasorda. Bremen was finally spotted and ushered off the field. He tried again, hiding out in the Mariners clubhouse whirlpool bath, until Seattle Mariners (and AL) trainer Gary Nicholson had him ejected from the premises.

Bremen dressed as an umpire at a 1980 World Series game and he walked out to home plate with actual umpires Harry Wendelstedt (NL), Don Denkinger (AL), Paul Pryor (NL), Bill Kunkel (AL), Dutch Rennert (NL), and Nick Bremigan before he was discovered.

In 1986, wearing a New York Mets uniform, Bremen again shagged flies in the outfield during the All-Star pre-game at the Houston Astrodome, when he was discovered and berated by NL All Star coach, then LA Dodgers manager Tommy Lasorda. After, Bremen was quoted as saying he was treated so poorly in jail that the all-star game stunt would be his last, and it was.

Football 
On December 16, 1979, Bremen posed as a Dallas Cowboys cheerleader at a Cowboys-Redskins game held at Texas Stadium in Irving, Texas. In preparation, Bremen lost twenty-three pounds, practiced drag routines with his wife, had a replica Dallas Cowboys cheerleader uniform custom-made, shaved his legs and spent $1,200 of his own money. During the game, Bremen burst onto the sidelines in boots, hot pants, falsies and a blond wig. He got out only one cheer  – "Go Dallas!" – before Cowboy security had him handcuffed. The Cowboys filed a $5,000 lawsuit for trespassing and creating a nuisance, and petitioned to have him banned from Cowboy games for life.

In 1981, Bremen posed as a line judge referee at Super Bowl XV at the Louisiana Superdome in New Orleans.

In 1982, Bremen, dressed as the San Diego Chicken, was stopped from entering Super Bowl XVI at the Pontiac Silverdome.

Golf 
At the 1979 U.S. Open, Bremen (who had a 7 handicap) sneaked on to Inverness Club in Toledo, Ohio, and played a practice round with Wayne Levi and Jerry Pate. He returned at the 1980 U.S. Open at the Baltusrol Golf Club, where he played so poorly in a practice round that a spectator asked the United States Golf Association's P.J. Boatwright, Jr. how such a lousy golfer had made it through qualifying.

In 1985, Bremen played a practice round with Fred Couples, Jay Haas, and Curtis Strange at the U.S. Open at the Oakland Hills Country Club in Bloomfield Hills, Michigan. Scouting the course early in the week, Bremen was introduced to Couples, then an up-and-coming pro. "I had a great chuckle with him," Couples said. "[Bremen] said, 'Obviously, I can't tee off with you, but I'll find you out there.'" A friend of Bremen's – an Oakland Hills member – smuggled Bremen's clubs and caddie into the club. Bremen, wearing a disguise and claiming to be a qualifier named Mark Diamond, went in search of Couples, who was playing a practice round with Haas.

Couples remembers:

At the 10th hole, Strange and Bob Eastwood joined the group. "We played as a fivesome. That's when I got a little nervous," Bremen said. "All they said was, 'We don't mind you playing as long as you keep the ball in play." Bremen claimed to have shot a 77. Bremen said that out of all of his stunts, he was proudest of his golf antics. "I was out there for the longest time," he said proudly, "and I was never caught."

Emmy Awards 
At the 1985 Emmy Awards in Pasadena, Bremen suddenly arose from a front-row seat and accepted from a confused Peter Graves a Best Supporting Actress award for Hill Street Blues actress Betty Thomas. Bremen was arrested and  fined $175 for his stunt. He later apologized to Thomas, telling her he had really thought she wasn't there to accept her award.

Fame and notoriety 

Due to his Great Imposter successes, Bremen became a celebrity in his own right in the '80's and made a number of TV appearances, including The Tonight Show with Johnny Carson, Late Night with David Letterman, and was named Sportsman Of The Week, twice, by Dick Schaap on The Today Show. He was interviewed in People Magazine, Parade Magazine, and by George Plimpton, among others.

Mini-documentary
In November 2013, director Matt Dilmore's short documentary, The Great Imposter, debuted as part of ESPN Films' 30-for-30 shorts series.  The 10-minute film stands as an oral history of Bremen's exploits and features interviews with members of the Bremen family as well as baseball great George Brett and sports reporter Jeremy Schaap. The film was aired online on Grantland.com and was reportedly instrumental in 30 for 30 Shorts winning an Emmy Award in 2014.

In 2022, Bremen and his antics were again the focus of an ESPN documentary by E:60, with the added bonus of his background as a sperm donor during the 1970s and 1980s. He aided in the birth of at least 35 known children.

"Retirement" and death 
In 2005, Bremen claimed to be retired from gatecrashing ("You've heard of the Taser gun? You've heard of 9/11? They don't ask questions anymore.") but he didn't rule out a final bow at a future U.S. Senior Open. "Could there be an opportunity when I'm 60? Yeah," he said, although when he later did turn 60, he was not reported to have attempted any impersonations.

Bremen died of esophageal cancer on his 64th birthday. He was buried at Mount Sinai Cemetery in Scottsdale, Arizona.

Legacy 
A 2022 ESPN E:60 documentary revealed that Bremen had for many years been a sperm donor. As of 2022, more than three dozen people are known to be Bremen’s biological children. The secret was discovered through an online DNA matching website. Through the documentary, the known children of Bremen were brought together for their first in-person meeting.

Bremen and his wife, Margo, raised three children of their own.

References 

 Footnotes

 Sources
 Not-So-Great Moments in Sports, HBO Home Video, 1988.

Impostors
2011 deaths
1947 births
People from West Bloomfield, Michigan
Deaths from cancer in Arizona